Pat Grace (28 May 1924 – 17 November 1997) was an  Australian rules footballer who played with South Melbourne in the Victorian Football League (VFL).

Grace was recruited from the Howlong Football Club.

Notes

External links 

1924 births
1997 deaths
Australian rules footballers from Victoria (Australia)
Sydney Swans players